Hotel Western is a building located in Nyssa, Oregon listed on the National Register of Historic Places.

History
The building is located at 9 Good Avenue in Nyssa, Oregon  and was constructed between 1904 and 1906. The hotel served travelers, as it was one block west of the railroad depot. Over time it was also a restaurant, furniture store, thrift shop and even apartments.

The hotel today
On September 6, 1996, it was placed on the National Register. Its restoration is underway and it will serve as a museum now.

See also
 National Register of Historic Places listings in Malheur County, Oregon

References

1904 establishments in Oregon
Buildings and structures in Malheur County, Oregon
Hotel buildings completed in 1904
Hotel buildings on the National Register of Historic Places in Oregon
National Register of Historic Places in Malheur County, Oregon
Nyssa, Oregon